The list of University of Oslo people includes notable academics and alumni affiliated with the University of Oslo (before 1939 the Royal Frederick University). The University of Oslo is Norway's oldest, and was its only university until 1946; hence its academics and alumni include a large number of the country's prominent academic and public figures.

Academics 
Prior to 1990, all (full) Professors were appointed by the King-in-Council.

Biology  
Fridtjof Nansen, appointed to a chair in zoology, 1897; in 1908 the chair was changed to a personal professorship in oceanography
Michael Sars
Nils Christian Stenseth

Economists 
Ragnar Frisch
Trygve Haavelmo

Chemistry 
Odd Hassel
Cato Maximilian Guldberg, pioneer in physical chemistry
Peter Waage

Physics 
Kristian Birkeland, invented the Birkeland-Eyde Process and nominated for the Nobel Prize seven times.
Ivar Giaever

Historians 
Francis Bull
Halvdan Koht
Geir Lundestad
Peter Andreas Munch
Arnved Nedkvitne
Jens Arup Seip
Francis Sejersted, professor of social and economic history; chairman of the Norwegian Nobel Committee

Law 
Johannes Andenæs, Professor of Jurisprudence, Rector of the university
Mads H. Andenæs
Jon Bing
Anders Bratholm
Sjur Brækhus
Kirsti Strøm Bull
Frede Castberg, Professor of Law, Rector of the university
Tove Stang Dahl, pioneer of women's law
Torstein Eckhoff
Aage Thor Falkanger
Carl August Fleischer
Francis Hagerup
Claus Winter Hjelm, Professor of Law, subsequently Supreme Court judge
Peter Lødrup
Knut Selmer
Carsten Smith, Professor of Law, subsequently Chief Justice of the Supreme Court
Eivind Smith
Lucy Smith
Tone Sverdrup
Bredo Henrik von Munthe af Morgenstierne, Professor of Law, Rector of the university
Frederik Zimmer

Mathematics 

Niels Henrik Abel, the Abel Prize in mathematics is named in his honour
 Carl Anton Bjerknes
 Sophus Lie, pioneer in abstract algebra; largely created the theory of continuous symmetry
 Peter Ludwig Mejdell Sylow
 Carl Størmer
 Elling Holst
 Viggo Brun
 Axel Thue
 Alf Victor Guldberg
 Richard Birkeland
 Thoralf Skolem
 Ralph Tambs-Lyche
 Øystein Ore, was also Sterling Professor of Mathematics at Yale University
 Ingebrigt Johansson
 Wilhelm Ljunggren
 Henrik Selberg
 Atle Selberg, winner of the Fields Medal
 Ernst Sejersted Selmer
 Erik Alfsen
 Arnfinn Laudal
 Erling Størmer
 Bernt Øksendal
 Ola Bratteli
 Ragni Piene
 Geir Ellingsrud
 Ragnar Winther
 John Grue
 Arne Sletsjøe

Medicine
Mahmood Amiry-Moghaddam
Kåre Berg
Carl Wilhelm Boeck
Christian Peder Bianco Boeck
Cæsar Peter Møller Boeck
Per Brandtzæg
Per Alf Brodal
Øyvind S. Bruland
Niels Christian Gauslaa Danbolt
Per Fugelli
Ivar Asbjørn Følling
Astrid Nøklebye Heiberg
Hjalmar Heiberg
Sverre Dick Henriksen
Frederik Holst
Torstein Hovig
Ragnvald Ingebrigtsen
Anton Jervell
Leiv Kreyberg
Einar Kringlen
Gabriel Langfeldt
Øivind Larsen
Otto Lous Mohr
G.H. Monrad-Krohn
Sjur Olsnes
Ole Petter Ottersen
Jan Ivar Pedersen
Alexander Pihl
Edvard Poulsson
Nils Retterstøl
Torleiv Ole Rognum
Bent Rolstad
Ola Didrik Saugstad
Carl Schiøtz
Carl Semb
Michael Skjelderup
Jon Storm-Mathisen
Axel Strøm
Theodor Thjøtta
Magnus Andreas Thulstrup
Hans Jacob Ustvedt
Guro Valen
Lars Walløe
Lars Weisæth

Philosophers 

 Arne Næss, philosopher

Political scientists 
Bernt Hagtvet
Janne Haaland Matlary, Professor of Political Science
Hanne Marthe Narud
Iver B. Neumann, Professor of Russian Studies
Trond Nordby
Hege Skjeie
Thomas Christian Wyller

Science 
Trude Storelvmo

Sociologists and criminologists 

Dag Album
Vilhelm Aubert
Margunn Bjørnholt
Grete Brochmann
Nils Christie
Ingrid Eide
Fredrik Engelstad
Ivar Frønes
Johan Galtung, founder of peace and conflict studies, held the world's first chair in that discipline at the University of Oslo 1969–1977
Erik Grønseth
Gudmund Hernes
Sverre Holm
Geir Høgsnes
Ragnvald Kalleberg
Suzanne Stiver Lie
Ulla-Britt Lilleaas
Sverre Lysgaard
Arne Mastekaasa
Thomas Mathiesen
Willy Pedersen
Natalie Rogoff Ramsøy
Sigurd Skirbekk
Dag Østerberg

Social anthropology 
Fredrik Barth
Unni Wikan

Palaeontology 
Jørn Hurum, Professor at the Natural History Museum, known for his work on the Darwinius fossil

Geology 
Adolf Hoel, one of the leading Arctic researchers in the first half of the 20th century; founder of the Norwegian Polar Institute; credited for Norway obtaining the sovereignty over Svalbard and Queen Maud Land; served as Rector of the university; namesake of the mineral hoelite and the Hoel Mountains

Linguistics 
Didrik Arup Seip, Professor of North Germanic languages; served as Rector of the university
Finn Thiesen
Finn-Erik Vinje

Notable alumni

Heads of government 

Otto Albert Blehr, Prime Minister of Norway (cand. jur.)
Gro Harlem Brundtland, Prime Minister of Norway (cand. med.)
Ingolf Elster Christensen, Chairman of the Administrative Council (cand. jur.)
Francis Hagerup, Prime Minister of Norway (cand. jur. and dr. juris.); Professor of Law at the University of Oslo
Otto B. Halvorsen, Prime Minister of Norway (cand. jur.)
Thorbjørn Jagland, Prime Minister of Norway (exam. oecon.)
Gunnar Knudsen, Prime Minister of Norway (cand. philos.)
Wollert Konow (SB), Prime Minister of Norway (law student, but did not graduate)
John Lyng, Prime Minister of Norway (cand. jur.)
Johan Ludwig Mowinckel, Prime Minister of Norway (cand. philos.)
Christian August Selmer, Prime Minister of Norway (cand. jur.)
Christian Schweigaard, Prime Minister of Norway (cand. jur.)
Emil Stang, Prime Minister of Norway (cand. jur.)
Frederik Stang, Prime Minister of Norway (cand. jur.)
Johannes Steen, Prime Minister of Norway (cand. philol.)
Jens Stoltenberg, Prime Minister of Norway (cand. oecon.)
Johan Sverdrup, Prime Minister of Norway (cand. jur.)
Jan P. Syse, Prime Minister of Norway (cand. jur.)
Kåre Willoch, Prime Minister of Norway (cand. oecon.)

Government and politics
Petrit Selimi, Deputy Minister of Foreign Affairs of Kosovo

Arts and media
Harald Eia, comedian (cand.polit. in sociology)
Imam Meskini, actress

Business and finance

 Håkon Wium Lie, developed Cascading Style Sheets and was Chief Technology Officer of Opera Software
Jon Stephenson von Tetzchner, CEO of Vivaldi Technologies

Lawyers and judges
Paal Berg, Chief Justice of the Supreme Court of Norway; also Minister of Justice and the Police
Sverre Grette, Chief Justice of the Supreme Court of Norway
Morten Diderik Emil Lambrechts, Chief Justice of the Supreme Court of Norway
Einar Løchen, Chief Justice of the Supreme Court of Norway; also Minister of Justice and the Police
Peder Carl Lasson, Chief Justice of the Supreme Court of Norway; also Minister of Justice and the Police
Hans Gerhard Colbjørnsen Meldahl, Chief Justice of the Supreme Court of Norway; also Minister of Justice and the Police
Rolv Ryssdal, Chief Justice of the Supreme Court of Norway
Erling Sandene, Chief Justice of the Supreme Court of Norway
Herman Scheel, Chief Justice of the Supreme Court of Norway; also Minister of Justice and the Police
Tore Schei, Chief Justice of the Supreme Court of Norway
Carsten Smith, Chief Justice of the Supreme Court of Norway
Emil Stang (born 1882), Chief Justice of the Supreme Court of Norway
Karenus Kristofer Thinn, Chief Justice of the Supreme Court of Norway
Iver Steen Thomle, Chief Justice of the Supreme Court of Norway; also Minister of Justice and the Police
Terje Wold, Chief Justice of the Supreme Court of Norway; also Minister of Justice and the Police

References

Oslo, University of